The Lake Merritt Plaza is a high-rise located in downtown Oakland, California, United States.

The building, developed by Transpacific Development Co., is designed by architect Bill Valentine. In 2006, TDC sold it to Boston-based Beacon Capital Partners for $160 million. Divco West acquired the building in 2014.

See also
List of tallest buildings in Oakland, California

References

External links

Skyscraper office buildings in Oakland, California
Office buildings completed in 1985
Landmarks in the San Francisco Bay Area